James Smith is a Canadian retired ice hockey defenseman who was an All-American for Denver.

Career
Smith was a solid player for Denver for most of his time with the Pioneers. For his first two seasons, he produced decent numbers but wasn't able to help the team finish any better than 5th in the 6-team WCHA. As a junior, the team got marginally better, recording a winning season for the first time since he joined the squad but still ended up 5th in the standings (now with 8 teams in the conference). All of that changed in his senior season.

Denver jumped out to a fast start in 1985 and rode the success to a first-place finish. Smith nearly doubled his career best offensive output and led the defensive corps in scoring, ending up in a tie for 5th in the nation from the blueline. He was named an All-American and helped the Pioneers win the WCHA Tournament for the first time since 1973. They also made their first NCAA Tournament for the first time in 13 years and reached the Frozen Four.

After graduating, Smith was able to use the success he found as a senior to continue his playing career. He produced respectable numbers for the Adirondack Red Wings over a season and a half but retired as a player in 1988.

Statistics

Regular season and playoffs

Awards and honors

References

External links

1964 births
Living people
Ice hockey people from British Columbia
Sportspeople from Castlegar, British Columbia
Canadian ice hockey defencemen
Denver Pioneers men's ice hockey players
AHCA Division I men's ice hockey All-Americans
Adirondack Red Wings players